Summer Rental is a 1985 American comedy film directed by Carl Reiner, written by Mark Reisman and Jeremy Stevens, and starring John Candy and Richard Crenna. It tells the story of an overworked air traffic controller who is put on a five weeks' paid leave and takes his family to the resort town of Citrus Cove, Florida, with different comical results. An original music score was composed for the film by Alan Silvestri. The film was released on August 9, 1985, by Paramount Pictures.

The film was met with negative reviews.

Plot
Overworked air traffic controller Jack Chester is given five weeks' paid leave as an alternative to being fired after nearly causing a mid-air collision on the job and having an outburst over what turned out to be a fly covering a radar blip. He uses this time off to take his wife Sandy and children Jennifer, Bobby, and Laurie on a summer vacation from the Atlanta area to the Gulf Coast resort town of Citrus Cove, Florida, where they are beset by a barrage of problems. First they are bumped out of the front of the line of an upscale seafood restaurant in favor of arrogant local sailing champion Al Pellet, who becomes Jack's main nemesis through the film. The family then misreads the address, moves into the wrong house, and are forced to leave in the middle of the night, ending up in a decrepit shack on a public beach with a constant stream of beach-goers tromping through the property. Jack then suffers a leg injury that prevents him from spending time with his family.

Later, Jack again locks horns with Al, the new owner of the dubious piece of real estate where the Chesters are staying after the previous owner died. Jack gives Al the check for $1,000 to cover the rent for the next two weeks, but Al tears up the check and orders the Chesters to leave the house when their first two weeks expire or he'll throw them out personally.

To avoid an early eviction, Jack challenges Al to a race at the upcoming Citrus Cove Regatta: If Al wins, Jack will pay him the $1,000 rent and take his family home; if Jack wins, he keeps the money and earns the right to stay in the house for two more weeks rent-free. Al scoffs at the notion that Jack could defeat him in a race, but accepts the challenge. However, Jack hasn't sailed for many years and doesn't even have a boat. Scully, a local saloon keeper with a pirate's mentality whom the Chesters met earlier, befriends Jack and volunteers to help him on both counts.

The bored Chesters come to life by helping Jack make his new vessel seaworthy. This motley crew is at first no match for Al or anybody else in the race, but tossing useless garbage overboard, a strong breeze, and a large pair of pants enable Jack to achieve a victory at sea.

Cast

Production
Filming took around nine weeks, from March 18 to May 15, 1985, with principal photography starting in St. Petersburg, Florida and St. Pete Beach, Florida, on March 18 for seven weeks before moving to Atlanta.

The film was based on a summer holiday taken by Bernie Brillstein when he rented a house at the beach in Southern California. "I have five children and I weigh 240 pounds," said Brillstein. "Being heavy in California is not a terrific thing. Being heavy on the beach is worse. The house on the left was occupied by two elderly sisters, one of whom had a 6-foot-4 inch mentally challenged son who was out of Arsenic and Old Lace. The house on the right was out of Death in Venice, occupied by a chic group of homosexuals who had 28 inch waists and wore peach sweaters."

It became a starring vehicle for John Candy. Director Carl Reiner said "Like a small, beautiful painting in a large frame, John is a handsome guy in a larger frame than is necessary."
The film was developed at Paramount by the team of Barry Diller, Michael Eisner and Jeffrey Katzenberg. They all ended up leaving the studio before the film was made. Brillstein expected the film to be cancelled. However, Paramount's new studio president Ned Tanen greenlit the film. "It was quite a good script, and we had no product," said Tanen. "There was a vacant spot of about six months on our release schedule. When all the geniuses are through, that's as good a reason as any to make a movie."

Candy and Reiner got along so well that they planned to make another film together at Paramount, titled The Last Holiday, but it never was made.
In a 1986 interview, Candy stated he was paid $800,000 for the role.

Locations
Summer Rental was filmed in St. Pete Beach, near St. Petersburg, Florida. Several local landmarks can be seen throughout the movie, including the St. Petersburg Pier during the final leg of the Regatta. Other landmarks include the old drawbridge on US19/I-275 north of the old Sunshine Skyway as well as shots of Egmont Key in the distance.

The air traffic control, radar room scene was filmed on location at the FAA Atlanta Air Route Traffic Control Center (ARTCC ZTL) in Hampton, Georgia.

Music
Jimmy Buffett's "Turning Around" plays during the closing credits. It is also played when the Chesters are fixing their boat, the Barnacle. The soundtrack is the only legitimate release of the song.

In 2014, Alan Silvestris score was released on a limited edition album by Quartet Records, twinned with his score for the 1987 film Critical Condition.

Release
Summer Rental was released in the United States on August 9, 1985, and was Candy’s first starring role in a feature film.

Home media
The film originally was released in the United States by Paramount on DVD in April 2001 on widescreen with a theatrical trailer as the sole special feature. It was reissued on DVD three more times. The United Kingdom released it on DVD in 2004 with the same extra feature.

Reception

Box office
Summer Rental opened in 1,584 theatres on August 9, 1985 with a domestic total of $24.7 million.

In the United States and Canada, it made $5,754,259 in its first weekend, ranking second at the box office. On its second weekend, it grossed $3,708,812 in 1,595 theaters, a 35% decrease over the previous week, ranking sixth. By the third weekend, it made $2.3 million and on its fourth $1.9 million over Labor Day weekend, ranking tenth. On the fifth weekend, it made over $1 million for a box-office total of $21,579,838. It made another $2.8 million on its sixth and final weekend, with an increase of 171%, climbing to second place behind Back to the Future.

Critical response
The film received negative reviews from critics.  

Janet Maslin of The New York Times called it "a wan but good-natured hot-weather comedy, with a big debt to National Lampoon's Vacation plus a few nice touches of its own."

Candy told Gene Siskel in 1986, "We shot it too fast,...We were trying to fill a time slot for Paramount."

References

External links
 
 
 
 

1985 films
1985 romantic comedy films
1980s adventure comedy films
American romantic comedy films
1980s English-language films
Films scored by Alan Silvestri
Films about vacationing
Films directed by Carl Reiner
Films set on beaches
Films set in Florida
Films shot in Florida
Films shot in Georgia (U.S. state)
Paramount Pictures films
American adventure comedy films
1980s American films
English-language comedy films